WWYC (1560 AM) is a radio station in Toledo, Ohio. It is now a repeater of KAWZ in Twin Falls, Idaho, the originator of a network of repeaters and mostly translators owned by CSN International.

History
WWYC signed on in 1946 as WTOD under the ownership of local labor rights attorney Edward Lamb.  The station was notable at its launch for having been among the fastest radio stations to sign-on after being awarded a construction permit.  WTOD's initial staff was composed largely of veterans returning from World War II. Lamb sold WTOD in 1957 to Detroit-based Booth Broadcasting.  Originally a station typical of the golden age of radio, it changed formats to Top 40 in 1959. The station was popular and competed with WOHO (1470 AM). The call-letters "TOD" stood for Top Of Dial, but the humorous meaning was "We're Toledo's Only Daytimer" as the station signed off at sundown in order to protect WQXR-AM, a 50,000 watt station (now WFME) in New York City.  In the top 40 era, WTOD was simulcast full-time on their FM signal at 99.9 with 9,500 watts and used the FM to continue at night.  Competitor WOHO was full-time with 1,000 watts day and night.  WTOD-AM operated with two towers and 5,000 watts daytime only.  In the early 1960's it was home to marquee personalities like: Bob Martz, John Garry, Larry Obrien, Tommy Dean,Mike Shaw, Fat Dean Clark, Lee Fowler, Bill Webb, Bob Brossia, Bob Kelly, Bob Parkinson who married Connie Francis and Diane Parkinson of Price Is Right fame, Bill Hughes, Bill Manders, Bob Zrake, Don Patrick, Don Williams, Mike Phillips, Dave Obrien aka Les Bortel, Rick Allen aka Earl Sharninghouse, Gary Shores aka Gary Hoffar, Mark Adams aka Mike Stutzman, Tom Rice aka Bob Pepas, Ed Hunter, Denny Williams, Mick Hodges, Buddy Carr, Norm Davis and others.  The FM split programming in 1966 becoming a black-oriented format as WKLR known as Kooler Radio sporting Djs like Calvin Baby Richards who then went to WOWO in Ft Wayne, et al, Toledos' first urban contemporary station.  Sadly, shortly after the flip, the station was destroyed in a devastating fire which some speculation was that it was arson.

In 1969 the format was changed to country music. WTOD became Toledo's first country music station. In the early 1990s, 1560 simulcasted on WRED 95.7 (now WIMX), this was short lived. WTOD then, became a simulcast station of fellow country station WKKO. With a few exceptions, WTOD was a full time simulcast of WKKO until 2004.

In the fall of 2004, the full-time simulcast of WKKO was dropped in favor of Syndicated Conservative Talk Radio.  Programming included Neal Boortz and Dave Ramsey.  The Weekends featured brokered programming, including Annunciation Radio. This was a Catholic-based religious show that would later wind up going full time on WNOC.

In March 2010, it was announced that WTOD would be acquired by CSN International (the Christian Satellite Network). On April 23, 2010, the call sign was changed to WWYC.

FM translator
WWYC simulcasts on a 250-watt repeater on 99.5 FM, which is located in Perrysburg, Ohio.

See also
CSN International translators

References

External links
FCC History Cards for WWYC

FM Translator

WYC
Radio stations established in 1946
1946 establishments in Ohio
WYC